Dongguksesigi (동국세시기,東國歲時記) is a book explaining the traditional customs of the year in Korea, written during the Joseon Dynasty by the scholar Hong Suk Mo. The book, finished in 1849, explains the origin of each custom in detail.

References

1849 books
Joseon dynasty works